Creek Bank is the fourth album to be released (but fifth album recorded) by blues/jazz pianist and vocalist Mose Allison which was recorded in 1958 and released on the Prestige label. It was reissued on CD, coupled with Young Man Mose, by Original Jazz Classics.

Reception

Scott Yanow, in his review for Allmusic, says it is his "typically ironic vocals that are most memorable, particularly Allison's classic "The Seventh Son" and "If You Live." His piano playing, even with the Bud Powell influence, was beginning to become original and he successfully performs both revived swing songs and moody originals".

Track listing 
All compositions by Mose Allison except where noted.
 "The Seventh Son" (Willie Dixon) – 2:36     
 "If I Didn't Care" (Jack Lawrence) – 4:25     
 "Cabin in the Sky" (Vernon Duke, John La Touche) – 4:04     
 "If You Live" – 2:31     
 "Yardbird Suite" (Charlie Parker) – 3:21     
 "Creek Bank" – 4:34     
 "Moon and Cypress" – 4:00     
 "Mule" – 3:51     
 "Dinner on the Ground" – 3:14     
 "Prelude to a Kiss" (Duke Ellington, Irving Gordon, Irving Mills) – 4:12

Personnel 
Mose Allison – piano, vocals
Addison Farmer – bass
Ronnie Free – drums

References 

Mose Allison albums
1958 albums
Prestige Records albums
Albums produced by Bob Weinstock
Albums recorded at Van Gelder Studio